The Woman in Black is a 1983 gothic horror novel by English writer Susan Hill. The plot concerns a mysterious spectre that haunts a small English town. A television film based on the story, also called The Woman in Black, was produced in 1989, with a screenplay by Nigel Kneale. In 2012, another film adaption was released, starring Daniel Radcliffe.

The book has also been adapted into a stage play by Stephen Mallatratt. It is the second longest-running play in the history of the West End, after The Mousetrap.

Plot 
The novel is narrated by Arthur Kipps, the young lawyer who formerly worked for Mr. Bentley. One Christmas Eve he is at home with his second wife Esmé and four stepchildren, who are sharing ghost stories. When he is asked to tell a story, he becomes irritated and leaves the room, and decides to write his horrific experiences several years in the past in the hopes that doing so will exorcise them from his memory.

Many years earlier, whilst still a junior solicitor for Bentley, Kipps is summoned to Crythin Gifford, a small market town on the north east coast of England, to attend the funeral of Mrs. Alice Drablow and settle her estate. Kipps is reluctant to leave his fiancée, Stella, but eager to get away from the dreary London fog. The late Mrs. Drablow was an elderly and reclusive widow who lived alone in the desolate and secluded Eel Marsh House. On his train ride there, he met a fairly wealthy landowner, Samuel Daily.

The house is situated on Nine Lives Causeway. At high tide, it is completely cut off from the mainland, surrounded only by marshes and sea frets. Kipps soon realised that there was more to the late Alice Drablow than he originally thought. At the funeral, he sees a woman dressed in black and with a pale face and dark eyes, whom a group of children are silently watching. While sorting through Mrs. Drablow's papers at Eel Marsh House over the course of several days, he endures an increasingly terrifying sequence of unexplained noises, chilling events and appearances by the Woman in Black. In one of these instances, he hears the sound of a horse and carriage in distress, closely followed by the screams of a young child and his maid, coming from the direction of the marshes.

Most of the people in Crythin Gifford are reluctant to reveal information about Mrs. Drablow and the mysterious woman in black. Any attempt by Kipps to find out the truth causes pained and fearful reactions. From various sources, he learns that Mrs. Drablow's sister, Jennet Humfrye, gave birth to a child, Nathaniel. Because she was unmarried, she was forced to give the child to her sister. Mrs. Drablow and her husband adopted the boy,  and insisted that he should never know that Jennet was his mother. The child's screams that Kipps heard were those of Nathaniel's ghost.
Jennet went away for a year. When realising she could not be parted for long from her son, she made an agreement to stay at Eel Marsh House with him as long as she never revealed her true identity to him. She secretly planned to abscond from the house with her son.  One day, a pony and trap carrying the boy across the causeway became lost and sank into the marshes, killing all aboard, while Jennet looked on helplessly from the window.

After Jennet died, she returned to haunt Eel Marsh House and the town of Crythin Gifford, as the malevolent Woman in Black. According to local tales, a sighting of the Woman in Black presaged the death of a child.

After some time (but still years before the beginning of the story), Kipps returns to London, marries Stella, has a child of his own, and tries to put the events at Crythin Gifford behind him. At a fair, while his wife and child are enjoying a pony and trap ride, Kipps sees the Woman in Black. She steps out in front of the horse and startles it, causing it to bolt and wreck the carriage against a tree, killing the child instantly and critically injuring Stella, who dies ten months later.

Kipps finishes his reminiscence with the words, "They have asked for my story. I have told it. Enough."

Stage play

The play of The Woman in Black was adapted by Stephen Mallatratt in December 1987 and started off as a low budget production for the new Christmas play in Scarborough. It turned out to be so successful that it arrived in London's West End two years later in January 1989, taking up residence at the London Fortune Theatre on 7 June that same year and is currently the second longest-running play in the West End. For the 30th Anniversary year the West End cast from May 2018-March 2019 was Richard Hope as Arthur Kipps and Mark Hawkins as the Actor, then from 19 March 2019 Stuart Fox with Matthew Spencer.  As of November 2022, Julian Forsyth now plays Arthur Kipps with Matthew Spencer still playing the Actor.
Mallatratt's version sees Arthur rehearsing with an actor in an attempt to perform the story to family and friends, which allows him to relive the haunting of Eel Marsh House as a play within a play.

Radio, television, and film adaptations
In 1989, the story was adapted for television by Nigel Kneale for Britain's ITV network and directed by Herbert Wise. The production starred Adrian Rawlins as Arthur Kidd (not Kipps), Bernard Hepton as Sam Toovey (not Sam Daily) and Pauline Moran as The Woman in Black.
In December 1993, BBC Radio 5 broadcast a four-part adaptation of the novel. It starred Robert Glenister (as young Arthur Kipps) and John Woodvine (as an old Arthur Kipps, who also narrates parts of the story). It was directed by Chris Wallis.
In October 2004, BBC Radio 4 broadcast a 56-minute version in its Saturday Play slot, adapted by Mike Walker. It starred James D'Arcy as Arthur Kipps, was directed by John Taylor and was a Fiction Factory production.
In February 2012, a film adaptation was released, starring Daniel Radcliffe (of Harry Potter fame) in the role of Arthur Kipps, and directed by James Watkins of Eden Lake fame. It is a separate adaptation of the novel, not a remake of the 1989 film, and develops a storyline quite different from that of the source material.

Sequel
A sequel of the book named The Woman in Black: Angel of Death was first published in the United Kingdom on 24 October 2013 and was published in the United States on 12 February 2014, written by Martyn Waites. It is a novelisation of the 2015 film The Woman in Black: Angel of Death.

References

External links
The Woman in Black at Susan Hill's official site

1983 British novels
British Gothic novels
British horror novels
British novels adapted into films
British novels adapted into plays
Ghost novels
Hamish Hamilton books
British novels adapted into television shows
Novels by Susan Hill
Novels set in England
Fiction about suicide
First-person narrative novels